Eugen Popescu Stadium is a multi-use stadium in Târgovişte, Romania currently undergoing re-construction. It is used mostly for football matches and is the home ground of Chindia Târgovişte. The stadium held 6,500 people and is located in the town center, next to the Chindia Tower.

The stadium was named after the former football player of Metalul Târgoviște and famous youth team coach Eugen Popescu (1928–1996), the creator of Chindia Târgoviște, team that promoted in 1996 to the Romanian Top League. Players like L. Reghecampf, B. Liță, C. Becheanu, T. Zamfirescu, R. Gâlmencea, A. Bogoi, C. Ţermure, C.I. Voicu, I. Ceauşu, M. Priseceanu, C. Bălaşa, M. Jilăveanu, R. Toboşaru, M. Antal, C. Negru, L. Strizu, have all been bred in the Târgoviște youth team center by Eugen Popescu.

External links
 Stadionul Eugen Popescu on Soccerway

Football venues in Romania
Buildings and structures in Târgoviște
Sport in Târgoviște
Buildings and structures in Dâmbovița County